Bağbaşı (former Eğiste) is a town in Hadim district of Konya Province, Turkey. It is situated in Toros Mountains. At  it is just at the south of a pass named after Eğiste. Bağbaşı is  planned to be the northern terminus of a   tunnel project named Blue tunnel where the southern terminal will be Atayurt in Mersin Province. After realising the project water from Göksu River will be fed to Konya villages. The population of the town is 1965 as of 2011.

References

Populated places in Konya Province
Towns in Turkey
Hadim District